The Secretary of State for Tourism (SETUR) is a high-ranking official of the Ministry of Industry, Trade and Tourism of the Government of Spain.

The Secretary of State for the Tourism is responsible for carrying out as many actions as are necessary for the definition, development, coordination and execution of the Government's tourist policies, without prejudice to the competencies of the Interministerial Committee for Tourism, as well as the institutional tourist relations of the General State Administration with international, public or private organizations, and international tourism cooperation, in coordination with the Ministry of Foreign Affairs.

In addition, and through the Tourism Institute of Spain (TURESPAÑA), whose Presidency corresponds to the Secretary of State, the SET exercises the function of external promotion of tourism. It's also the department responsible for the management of the Fund for the Modernization of Tourist Infrastructures (FOMIT), a fund destined to support the renovation and modernization plans of developed tourist destinations manage by the local administrations and public tourist companies.

History
The Office of Secretary of State for Tourism was created in summer 1977 after a massive State Administration reform. According to the law that created it, the Secretariat of State assumed the competences of the suppressed Undersecretariat of Tourism and all the bodies that integrated it were transferred to the new Secretariat of State. The Undersecretariat of Tourism was created in 1952 and was integrated in the Ministry of Information and Tourism, that was also suppressed in 1977 and replaced by the Ministry of Trade and Tourism.

In 1982, the Secretariat of State is suppressed after a government reform that created a new Ministry called Ministry of Transport, Tourism and Communications and its competences were transferred to a newly body named General Secretariat for Tourism. This General Secretariat survived until 2011 but since 1996 to 2000 was subordinated to the Secretariat of State for Trade, Tourism and SMEs with the First Aznar Government, to the Secretary of State for Trade and Tourism from 2000 to 2004 with the Second Aznar Government, to the Secretary of State for Tourism and Trade from 2004 to 2008 with the First Zapatero Government and from 2008 to 2011 to the Secretary of State for Tourism, after being suppressed by the pro-austerity Government of Mariano Rajoy.

Since 2011 the Secretariat of State has been autonomous and mainly focused in managing the Spanish tourism sector which has become one of the most developed and most important sectors in the economy, representing almost a 12% of GDP and a 13% of the employment by 2018 with more than 82 million tourist each year.

Names
 Secretary of State for Tourism (1977–1981)
 Secretary of State for Trade, Tourism and SMEs (1996–2000)
 Secretary of State for Trade and Tourism (2000–2004)
 Secretary of State for Tourism and Trade (2004–2008)
 Secretary of State for Tourism (2008–present)

Structure
The Secretariat of State is composed of three departments, all of them run by a Deputy Director-General:
 The Deputy Directorate-General for Tourism Cooperation and Competitiveness.
 It's the department responsible for tourism cooperation and coordination with the competent bodies of other ministerial departments, the Autonomous Communities and local entities, as well as with private agents, for the preparation of the bases and the general planning of tourism policy, especially through the Sectoral Conference for Tourism, the Spanish Council for Tourism and the Interministerial Commission for Tourism; the exercise of international tourism relations of the General State Administration, both bilaterally and with international tourism organizations of a multilateral nature, as well as the exercise of international tourism cooperation, in coordination with the Ministry of Foreign Affairs; and the information, analysis of opportunities and the support to the implantation abroad of the Spanish tourist companies, in collaboration with the corresponding organs of the General State Administration.
 The Deputy Directorate-General for Development and Tourism Sustainability
 It's the department responsible for the design and implementation of strategies aimed at the development and improvement of tourist destinations based on quality, the promotion of excellence, public-private co-responsibility, social participation, environmental, social and economic sustainability and adaptation to new requirements of demand; the development of plans and programs that promote innovation, quality, sustainability and competitiveness of tourist products with high added value for the client; as well as the promotion of new product categories that contribute to the deseasonalization and deconcentration of the offer, all based on public-public and public-private collaboration; the design, promotion and coordination of strategies that promote the use of emerging technologies in the sector, both in destinations, and in tourism management itself, promoting connectivity, intelligence and presence in networks and the management of other programs of economic support to the tourism sector that are assigned to the Secretary of State for Tourism.
 The Division of Information Analysis and Evaluation of Tourism Policies

From the Secretariat of State also depends organically the Solicitor's Office in the Ministry and the state-owned companies Institute of Tourism of Spain (TURESPAÑA), Paradores and the State Mercantile Society for the Management of Innovation and Tourism Technologies (SEGITTUR).

List of SETURs

References

Secretaries of State of Spain
Tourism in Spain